Bill Gardner (born 29 January 1954) is an English football supporter, former football hooligan and co-author of books on football hooliganism.

Born in Hornchurch, Essex, Gardner came to prominence in the 1970s as a supporter of West Ham United and as a member of the Mile End Boys and not  firm, the I.C.F.
Gardner was arrested by the Metropolitan police in 1987 as part of Operation Fulltime. The aim of this police operation was to bring football hooligans to justice.

Following a renewed interest by the public in the 21st century in football hooliganism of the 1970s and 1980s, Gardner featured prominently on the cover of fellow I.C.F. member Cass Pennant's 2003  book "Congratulations, You Have Just Met the I. C. F." In 2005 Gardner published his autobiography "Good Afternoon, Gentlemen, the Name's Bill Gardner" detailing his involvement in hooliganism. The book was co-written with Cass Pennant.

Gardner was portrayed by Stuart Moore in the 2007 film Rise of the Footsoldier which details the life of another member of the I.C.F., Carlton Leach.
The film shows an incident involving Gardner and the I.C.F. fighting supporters of Manchester United, the Red Army, on the terraces at Old Trafford where he starts a fight by throwing a hot Bovril drink over an opposing fan. This mirrors a real life incident where Gardner himself had hot tea thrown over him by Manchester United fans.

In 2020, Gardner published another autobiography "Bill Gardner: The Man, The Myth, The Legend", written with Abe Atchia. The book details the abuses and crime in his life.

References

Living people
Association football supporters
1954 births
People from Hornchurch
English autobiographers
West Ham United F.C.
Organized crime memoirists
Former hooligans